The 2014 Oregon State Beavers men's soccer team represented Oregon State University during the 2014 NCAA Division I men's soccer season. The Beavers played in the Pac-12 Conference, and earned their first at-large bid into the NCAA Tournament since 2003.

Roster

Schedule 
Rankings reflect those of the NSCAA poll taken the week of the respective matches.

References 

Oregon State Beavers
Oregon State Beavers men's soccer seasons
Oregon State Beavers
Oregon State Beavers